The European Chemical Society (EuChemS) is a European non-profit organisation which promotes collaboration between non-profit scientific and technical societies in the field of chemistry.

Based in Brussels, Belgium, the association took over the role and responsibilities of the Federation of European Chemical Societies and Professional Institutions (FECS) founded in 1970. It currently has 50 Member Societies and supporting members, with a further 19 divisions and working parties. It represents more than 160,000 chemists from more than 30 countries in  Europe.

On 3 October 2019, the EuChemS General Assembly voted Floris Rutjes of Radboud University as EuChemS President-Elect. His term as President began in January 2021. Nineta Hrastelj is Secretary General. Pilar Goya Laza, research professor of the Spanish National Research Council (CSIC), is Vice-President of EuChemS.

Aims and function

The European Chemical Society has two major aims. By bringing together national chemical societies from across Europe, it aims to foster a community of scientists from different countries and provide opportunities for them to exchange ideas, communicate, cooperate on work projects and develop their networks. EuChemS in turn relies on the knowledge of this community to provide sound scientific advice to policymakers at the European level, in order to better inform their decision-making work. EuChemS is an official accredited stakeholder of the European Food Safety Agency (EFSA) and the European Chemical Agency (ECHA). EuChemS also relies on quality science communication to better inform citizens, decision-makers and scientists of the latest research developments in the chemical sciences, and their role in tackling major societal, environmental and economic challenges.

Because the field of chemistry is particularly vast with many different disciplines within it, EuChemS provides advice and knowledge on a broad range of subjects including:

EU Research Framework Programmes, such as Horizon 2020 and Horizon Europe 
Open Science 
Education and STEM 
Environmental issues and climate change 
Circular Economy 
Renewable Energy 
Food safety 
Science literacy 
Health 
Ethics and scientific integrity 
Cultural Heritage
Chemical and nuclear safety

EuChemS is a signatory of the EU Transparency register. The register number is: 03492856440-03.

Divisions and Working Parties

The EuChemS scientific divisions and working parties are networks in their own fields of expertise and promote collaboration with other European and international organisations. They organise high quality scientific conferences in chemical and molecular sciences and interdisciplinary areas.

 Division of Analytical Chemistry
 Division of Chemical Education
 Division of Chemistry and the Environment
 Division of Chemistry in Life Sciences
 Division of Computational Chemistry
 Division of Food Chemistry
 Division of Green and Sustainable Chemistry
 Division of Inorganic Chemistry
 Division of Nuclear and Radiochemistry

 Division of Organic Chemistry
 Division of Organometallic Chemistry
 Division of Physical Chemistry
 Division of Solid State Chemistry
 Division of Chemistry and Energy
 Working Party on Chemistry for Cultural Heritage
 Working party on Ethics in Chemistry
 Working Party on the History of Chemistry

 
The European Young Chemists' Network (abbreviated to EYCN) is the younger members' division of EuChemS.

Events

EuChemS organises a variety of different events, including policy workshops with the European Institutions, specialised academic conferences, as well as the biennial EuChemS Chemistry Congress (ECC). There have been 8 Congresses so far since the first in 2006, held in Budapest, Hungary.

The congresses have taken place in: Turin, Italy (2008); Nuremberg, Germany (2010); Prague, Czechia (2012); Istanbul, Turkey (2014); Seville, Spain (2016); Liverpool, UK (2018), Lisbon, Portugal (2022). The next ECC is set to be held in Dublin, Ireland in 2024.  The ECCs usually attract some 2000 chemists from more than 50 countries across the world.

Awards

EuChemS proposes several awards including the European Chemistry Gold Medal Award, awarded in 2018 to Nobel Laureate Bernard Feringa and in 2020 to Michele Parrinello; the EuChemS Award for Service; the EuChemS Lecture Award; the European Young Chemists' Award; the EuChemS EUCYS Award; the EuChemS Historical Landmarks Award, as well as several Divisional Awards.

EuChemS implemented in 2020 the EuChemS Chemistry Congress fellowship scheme. The aim of EuChemS fellowship scheme is to support early career researchers (bachelor, masters and PhD students) actively attending the EuChemS Chemistry Congresses.

EuChemS Gold Medal 
The EuChemS Gold medal is awarded to reflect the exceptional achievements of scientists working in the field of chemistry in Europe.

2022
Dame Carol Robinson
2020
Michele Parrinello
2018
Bernard L. Feringa

EuChemS Historical Landmarks Awards 
The EuChemS Historical Landmarks Award recognize sites important in the history of chemistry in Europe:
2020
Prague, Czech Republic (50 anniversary of the foundation of EuChemS).
Giessen, Germany, Justus Liebig’s Laboratory.
2019
Almadén mines in Spain (producing mercury for Spain and the Spanish empire) and Edessa Cannabis Factory Museum, Greece (a preserved factory producing ropes and twine from hemp).
2018
The Ytterby mine in Sweden (linked to the discovery of 8 chemical elements) and ABEA in Crete, Greece (a factory processing olive oil).

Projects and activities

In light of the UN declared International Year of the Periodic Table of Chemical Elements of 2019, EuChemS published a Periodic Table which depicts the issue of the abundance of the chemical elements to raise awareness of the need to develop better recycling capacities, to manage waste, and to find alternative materials to the elements that are at risk of being unusable.

Members & Supporting Members

 Austrian Chemical Society
 Austrian Society of Analytical Chemistry
 Royal Flemish Chemical Society
 Walloon Royal Society of Chemistry
 Union of Chemists in Bulgaria
 Croatian Chemical Society
 Pancyprian Union of Chemists
 Czech Chemical Society
 Danish Chemical Society
 Estonian Chemical Society
 Finnish Chemical Society
 French Chemical Society
 German Chemical Society 
 German Bunsen Society for Physical Chemistry
 Association of Greek Chemists 
 Hungarian Chemical Society 
 Institute of Chemistry of Ireland 
 Israel Chemical Society 
 Italian Chemical Society 
 Lithuanian Chemical Society
 Association of Luxembourgish Chemists 
 Society of Chemists and Technologists of Macedonia
 Chemical Society of Montenegro
 Royal Dutch Chemical Society 
 Norwegian Chemical Society
 Polish Chemical Society
 Portuguese Chemical Society
 Portuguese Electrochemical Society
 Romanian Chemical Society
 Mendeleev Russian Chemical Society
 Russian Scientific Council on Analytical Chemistry 
 Serbian Chemical Society 
 Slovak Chemical Society
 Slovenian Chemical Society 
 Royal Spanish Chemical Society
 Spanish Society of Analytical Chemistry (SEQA)
 Asociación Nacional de Químicos de España (ANQUE) – ANQUE
 Catalan Chemical Society
 Swedish Chemical Society 
 Swiss Chemical Society
 Turkish Chemical Society 
 Royal Society of Chemistry

Supporting members:
 European Nanoporous Materials Institute of Excellence (ENMIX)
 European Chemistry Thematic Network Association (ECTN)
 European Federation of Managerial Staff in the Chemical and Allied Industries (FECCIA) 
 European Research Institute of Catalysis (ERIC)
 European Federation for Medicinal Chemistry (EFMC)
 International Sustainable Chemistry Collaborative Centre (ISC3)
 ChemPubSoc Europe
 Italian National Research Council (CNR)

See also
 European Chemist
 European Physical Society
 Timeline of chemistry
 European Research Council
 Marie Skłodowska-Curie Actions

References

External links
 EuChemS
 EuChemS Newsletter
 Brussels News Updates
 1st EuChemS Chemistry Congress 2006
 2nd EuChemS Chemistry Congress 2008
 3rd EuChemS Chemistry Congress 2010
 4th EuChemS Chemistry Congress 2012
 5th EuChemS Chemistry Congress 2014
 6th EuChemS Chemistry Congress 2016
 7th EuChemS Chemistry Congress 2018
 8th EuChemS Chemistry Congress 2022

Chemistry societies
International scientific organizations based in Europe
Organizations established in 1970